Evelyn Georgianna Sears (March 9, 1875 – November 10, 1966) was an American tennis player at the beginning of the 20th century.

In 1907, she won the U.S. National Championship women's singles title, after beating Carrie Neely 6–3, 6–2 in the All-Comers final and the default of reigning champion Helen Homans in the Challenge Round. She also won the women's doubles title in 1908 with Margaret Curtis, beating Carrie Neely and Miriam Steever, 6–3, 5–7, 9–7.

She was a cousin of the seven times winner of the men's singles title at the U.S. National Championship Richard Sears.

Grand Slam finals

Singles (1 title, 1 runner-up)

Doubles (1 title)

References

United States National champions (tennis)
1875 births
1966 deaths
Grand Slam (tennis) champions in women's singles
Grand Slam (tennis) champions in women's doubles
American female tennis players
Tennis people from Massachusetts